Dolores Dembus Bittleman (born 1931) is an American fiber artist and art conservator. Bittleman's work includes fiber and silk tapestries. Bittleman is in the collection of the Museum of Modern Art (MoMA), where she has been featured in several exhibitions. Bittleman has also shown at the Lausanne International Tapestry Biennial and the Everson Museum of Art in Syracuse, New York.

Bittleman studied with Anni Albers at Yale University. Bittleman exhibited at Bennington College in 1968. Bittleman was married to artist and educator Arnold Bittleman.

See also
Fibre Art
Wall Hangings

References

Further reading
 Bittleman, Dolores Dembus. "Gemini." Craft Horizons. 31 (Oct. 1971): 30. Print.
 Larson, Jack Lenor. "Two Views of the Fifth Tapestry Bienniale: The Greatest Craft Show on Earth." Craft Horizons. 31 (Oct. 1971): 23, 62. Print.

1931 births
Living people
American textile artists
20th-century American women artists
21st-century American women artists
20th-century women textile artists
20th-century textile artists
21st-century women textile artists
21st-century textile artists